= Ted Jenkin =

- Born: Princeton, New Jersey, U.S.
- Education: Boston College
- Occupations: Personal finance expert Businessperson
- Organization: Exit Stage Left Advisors
- Notable work: The 21-Day Budget Cleanse; Real Life, Real Money
- Spouse: Eugenia Jenkin
- Children: 3

Ted Jenkin is an American businessman and author. He is a co-founder and current chief executive officer of oXYGen Financial.

He is also a co-host of podcast, The Shrimp Tank.

== Early life and family ==
Born in Princeton, New Jersey, Jenkin's mother was a schoolteacher and his father died when he was young. His interest developed in personal finance in a bid to help his mother who was in financial distress after the death of his father.

Jenkin is a graduate of Boston College. He is also certified by College for Financial Planning as a financial planner.

Jenkin is married to Eugenia and they have three children.

== Career ==
Jenkin started his career at the age of 12 when he started a pet walking service.

In 2017, he co-founded a podcast, The Shrimp Tank.

He founded oXYGen Financial in 2009 which provides wealth management services, insurance services, and retirement plans for Generation X and Y. The company has $1.2 billion assets-under-management.

The Atlanta Magazine has included him in 2020 and 2021 Atlanta's 500 Most Powerful Leaders.

== Bibliography ==
- Jenkin, Ted; Greg, Abel (2019). The 21-Day Budget Cleanse
- Jenkin, Ted (2016). Real Life, Real Money
